Artemis Technologies is an applied technologies spin off from the successful Artemis Racing America’s Cup team. It is named after Artemis, the ancient Greek goddess.

The company is developing the Artemis eFoiler electric hydrofoiling boat.

History

Iain Percy is the CEO of Artemis Technologies.

The 13-partner Belfast Maritime Consortium, of which Artemis Technologies was the founder, in May 2020 won a competitive bid for the UK Research and Innovation’s flagship Strength in Places Fund.

In October 2020, Nus Ghani was announced as a non-executive director of the firm, which promised to "revolutionise the future of maritime transport" by winning "the multi-million pound UK government innovation grant... to develop zero-emission ferries in Belfast".

External links

References

Technology companies